KF Drenasi is a professional football club from Kosovo which competes in the First League. The club is based in Drenas. Their home ground is the Rexhep Rexhepi Stadium which has a seating capacity of 6,000.

Players

Current squad

See also
 List of football clubs in Kosovo

References

Football clubs in Kosovo
Association football clubs established in 2000